The MetroCenter is located in Arlington, Texas and was opened in January 2005. It was built entirely with private funds and seats 1,750. It was designed by Beck Group Architecture and constructed by Manhattan Construction Company. Acoustic Dimensions designed the high end audio and video system and Ford Audio and Video handled the installation. Phase two of its construction will take the total seating capacity to 3,200.
The MetroCenter is an extension of Fielder Road Baptist Church, and is the brainchild of Senior Pastor Dr. Gary Smith and Executive Pastor Mike Wierick.  The MetroCenter hosts concerts, theatrical productions, conferences and other community events, and is also used by Fielder Road as a place of worship. In March 2007 the MetroCenter was voted #2 Top Performing Arts Venues in Fort Worth by the Fort Worth Business Press.
Built as a multi-purpose facility,  the MetroCenter is able to house symphony, stage, musicals, conferences and rock concerts.

See also
List of concert halls

External links 
Ford Audio and Video
Beck Group
Acoustic Dimensions

Concert halls in Texas
Theatres in Texas
Performing arts centers in Texas
Buildings and structures in Tarrant County, Texas
Tourist attractions in Tarrant County, Texas